Meselech Melkamu (born 27 April 1985 in Debre Marqos) is an Ethiopian long-distance runner. She defeated Meseret Defar to win the 5000 metres gold medal at the 2008 African Athletics Championships, but she is better known for her 29:53.80 run over 10,000 metres in 2009, which until August 2016 ranked her second on the all-time list behind  world record holder Wang Junxia. She is one of seven woman in history to break the 30-minute barrier and one of four Ethiopians to accomplish the feat.

Since 2012, she has competed in road races. She won the 2012 Frankfurt Marathon in a course record and personal best of 2:21:01 hours.

Career
She made her breakthrough in the junior ranks in 2004 by winning the IAAF World Cross Country Championships and taking the 5000 metres title at the World Junior Championships in Athletics.

She just missed the senior medals in 2005, taking fourth in the short race at the World Cross Country Championships and fourth in the 5000 metres at the World Championships.

Her first major medals as a senior athlete came the following year as Melkamu won bronze medals in both the long and short races at the 2006 IAAF World Cross Country Championships (also winning two team golds). She went on to win the 10 kilometres Great Ireland Run the following month in an event-record 31:41 minutes finish time.

She repeated her cross country bronze medal in 2007, helping the Ethiopian women win the team gold again. She also won a silver medal on the track at the All-Africa Games, finishing as runner-up behind Meseret Defar in the 5000 metres. She was sixth over that distance at the World Championships later that year.

Melkamu won her first indoor medal over 3000 metres in March 2008, again taking the second spot behind Defar at the World Indoor Championships. She did not win a medal at the World Cross Country Championships (finishing in ninth place), but she defeated Defar to win the 5000 metres at the African Championships. She was selected to represent Ethiopia at the Summer Olympic Games in Beijing, finishing seventh in the 5000 metres final in a time of 15:49.03. (She finished the race in eight place but rose to seventh after Elvan Abeylegesse's runner-up finish was expunged years later because of doping.)

She returned to the podium at the 2009 World Cross Country Championships, taking another bronze medal. On 14 June, she broke the African record in the 10,000 metres with a time of 29:53.80 at a race in Utrecht, Netherlands, bettering Tirunesh Dibaba's time of 29:54.66. She won her first world track medal later that season, finishing as runner-up to Linet Masai in the 10,000 metres at the World Championships.

She continued her bronze medal streak at the 2010 World Cross Country Championships. On 31 July, she won a silver medal at the African Championships in Nairobi, finishing second to Dibaba in the 10,000 metres. To finish the year, she won the Obudu Ranch International Mountain Race in the Obudu local government area of Nigeria, which doubled as the African Mountain Running Championships.

In February 2011, she won her fourth career title at the Jan Meda International Cross Country in Addis Ababa.

At the 2012 Frankfurt Marathon, her first marathon, she stayed in the lead group until the 37 kilometre mark, after which she pulled away to victory in a new course record of 2:21:01 hours.

In February 2013, she ran a half marathon personal best of 1:08:05 hours while finishing in seventh place at the Ras Al Khaimah Half Marathon in the United Arab Emirates.

Personal bests
 1500 metres – 4:07.52 (2007)
 Mile run – 4:33.94 (2003)
 2000 metres (indoor) - 5:39.2 (2007) (intermediate time in a longer race) (12th fastest ever as of 2 April 2017)
 3000 metres (outdoor) - 8:34.73 (2005)
 3000 metres (indoor) - 8:23.74 (2007) (4th fastest ever as of 17 June 2017)
 5000 metres (outdoor) – 14:31.91 (2010)
 10,000 metres (track) – 29:53.80 (2009) (6th fastest ever as of 5 July 2017)
 10 kilometres (road) – 31:17 (2013) (intermediate time in a longer race), 31:41 (2006)
 15 kilometres (road) - 47:54 (2013) (intermediate time in a longer race)
 20 kilometres (road) - 1:04:32 (2013) (intermediate time in a longer race)
 Half marathon - 1:08:05 (2013)
 30 kilometres (road) - 1:39.21 (2014) (intermediate time in a longer race)
 Marathon – 2:21:01 (2012)

International competitions

References

External links

Focus on athletes – In-depth article

1985 births
Living people
Sportspeople from Amhara Region
Ethiopian female long-distance runners
Ethiopian female marathon runners
Olympic athletes of Ethiopia
Athletes (track and field) at the 2008 Summer Olympics
World Athletics Championships athletes for Ethiopia
World Athletics Championships medalists
Frankfurt Marathon female winners
African Games silver medalists for Ethiopia
African Games medalists in athletics (track and field)
Athletes (track and field) at the 2007 All-Africa Games
Athletes (track and field) at the 2011 All-Africa Games
People from Debre Markos
21st-century Ethiopian women